Schnapps ( or ) or schnaps is a type of alcoholic beverage that may take several forms, including distilled fruit brandies, herbal liqueurs, infusions, and "flavored liqueurs" made by adding fruit syrups, spices, or artificial flavorings to neutral grain spirits.

The English loanword "schnapps" is derived from the colloquial German word Schnaps  (plural: Schnäpse), which is used in reference to spirit drinks.
The word Schnaps stems from Low German and is related to the German term "schnappen", meaning "snap", which refers to the spirit usually being consumed in a quick slug from a small glass (i.e., a shot glass).

European

The German term Schnaps refers to "any kind of strong, dry spirit", similar to how eau de vie (water of life) is used in French, aguardiente (burning water) in Spanish, or aguardente Portuguese.

Obstler

An Obstler, or Obstbrand (from the German Obst, fruit and Brand, brandy), is a traditional type of schnaps made by fermenting macerated fruit and distilling to produce a clear, unsweetened fruit brandy. Obstler is traditionally produced in Austria, Switzerland, southern Germany, and the culturally German regions of Alsace and Lorraine in modern-day France. Obstler is mainly associated with the southern part of the German-language area; in northern Germany, almost all traditional distilled beverages are grain-based.

The main kinds of fruit used for Obstbrände are apples, apricots, cherries, pears, plums (both mirabelle and purple plums), and quinces. Fruits other than these are rarely used. Apples together with pears produce Obstwasser (fruit water); pears are used to produce Birnenbrand; when made from the Williams pear, it is known as Poire Williams or Williamsbrand. Several types of plums make  ("plum water"); cherries make kirschwasser ("cherry water"); and apricots are used to make Austrian Marillenschnaps (apricot brandy).

The different kinds of Obstler are similar to the varieties of Rakija found in the Balkans and Eastern Europe. Slivovitz is a popular schnapps made from Damson plums found throughout the region; pálinka is a traditional distilled beverage made of any fruits grown in Hungary.

Geist

A Geist (meaning "spirit" in German) is a type of schnapps, similar to fruit brandy, that is created by infusing macerated fresh berries in neutral spirits and steeping for some time before distillation. Neutral alcohol is necessary because many berries have a sugar content that is too low to economically ferment and distill; raspberries, for instance, contain between 4.5 and 6.0% sugar.

The most common Geist is Himbeergeist, made from raspberries. Other common fruits are blueberries, blackberries, strawberries, currants, rowanberries, apricots, peaches, and sloes. Other flavorings are also possible, such as nuts, herbs, or rose petals.

Liqueur
Many liqueurs referred to as schnapps, but distinct from fruit brandies, are created by the addition of herbal or fruit flavors to a neutral spirit by various methods. The neutral spirit used can vary by location and tradition.

The most popular schnapps in the UK is peach schnapps. It can be enjoyed in many ways; most prefer it on the rocks or mixed with other drinks to form a variety of cocktails. It is made by adding peach flavouring to a neutral grain spirit. It is typically clear and has a strong, sweet taste. It became popular in the UK in the 1970s and 1980s. The leading brand is Archers, but some large supermarkets do have their own branded peach schnapps, which is sold at a reduced price. Archers peach schnapps is more similar to the American style of schnapps.

Kräuterlikör (herbal liqueur) is similar to Italian amaro. Well-known brands include Jägermeister, Underberg, Kuemmerling, Killepitsch, and Wurzelpeter.

American
An inexpensive, heavily sweetened form of liqueur is made in America by mixing neutral grain spirit with fruit syrup, spices, or other flavors. Referred to as "schnapps", these are bottled with an alcohol content typically between 15 and 20% ABV (30–40 proof), though some may be much higher. Schnapps, specifically peach and peppermint schnapps, exploded in popularity in America in the 1980s.

See also

References

External links

German distilled drinks